Tevita Tameilau (born January 22, 1990) is an American rugby player who plays as a loose forward for the San Diego Legion of Major League Rugby (MLR) and also for the United States national rugby union team.

He previously played for the Glasgow Warriors in the Guinness Pro14. 

Tameilau is the son of Moses Similai, who played rugby internationally.

Amateur career
Tameilau played for U.S. youth teams, and played in the 2007 U19 World Cup and 2008 Junior World Championship. Tameilau attended San Francisco City College, then went on a religious mission, then played American football with the NCAA Division II West Texas A&M Buffaloes.

Professional career
In 2015, Tameilau decided to again focus on rugby. He played for SFGG in the Pacific Rugby Premiership, and then trained with the Taranaki Rugby Academy. In early 2016, he signed for the San Francisco Rush, North America's first professional rugby competition.

In early 2016, Tameilau was predicted to be the breakout player of the year for the U.S. Tameilau debuted for the U.S. national team in the 2016 Americas Rugby Championship.

Tameilau was drafted to Currie in the Scottish Premiership for the 2018-19 season.

In November 2019, Tameilau was released by Glasgow Warriors. Following this, he was signed by the San Diego Legion on 12 November 2019.

Rugby league
In 2020 Tameilau played in the California Rugby League for the East Palo Alto Razorbacks.

References

Living people
American rugby league players
American rugby union players
1990 births
Rugby union number eights
United States international rugby union players
San Francisco Rush players
Glasgow Warriors players
Currie RFC players
People from Redwood City, California
RC Narbonne players
Utah Warriors players
San Diego Legion players